The Risk is a small rural locality approximately  north-west of Kyogle in the local government area of Kyogle Council, part of the Northern Rivers region of New South Wales, Australia.

The Risk Public School, a small primary school with approximately 30 pupils, is located within the area.

References

Kyogle Council
Northern Rivers
Towns in New South Wales